Arnioceras is an extinct genus of large, evolute, discoidal ammonite from the Lower Jurassic.  The shell is normally coiled so that all whorls are exposed. Sides bear strong sharp ribs that are straight until reaching the ventrolateral edge where they swing forward and fade. The rim (venter) is keeled and free of grooves.

Arnioceras, named by Alpheus Hyatt, is included in the arietitid family of the Psiloceratoidea, an ammonitid superfamily.  Its distribution is fairly worldwide, having been found in Europe, south Asia, and North and South America.

References
Notes

Bibliography

Jurassic ammonites
Jurassic ammonites of North America
Ammonitida genera
Early Jurassic ammonites
Hasle Formation
Taxa named by Alpheus Hyatt
Fossil taxa described in 1897
Arietitidae